Pathona is a small town in Arghakhanchi District in the Lumbini Zone of southern Nepal.

References

Populated places in Arghakhanchi District